Sir Charles Haukes Todd Crosthwaite  (5 December 1835, Dublin – 28 May 1915) served as Chief Commissioner of the British Crown Colony of Burma from March 1887 to December 1890.

Early life

He was born in Dublin, educated at Merchant Taylors' School. and St John's College, Oxford.

Career

Crosthwaite entered into the Bengal Civil Service 1857 and served chiefly in the N.W.P.  He was Chief Commissioner of British Burma from 1883 to 1884; then Chief Commissioner of Central Provinces from 1885 to 1886.  From 1887 to 1890 Sir Charles Hawkes Todd Crosthwaite was Chief Commissioner of Burma.  He was then a Member of the Governor-General's Supreme Council from 1890 to 1895; and  Lieutenant Governor of N.W.P and Oudh. He was a member of the Council of India from 1895 to 1905.

Titles
1835–1887: Charles Hawkes Todd Crosthwaite
1887–1888: Charles Hawkes Todd Crosthwaite, CSI
1888–1915: Sir Charles Hawkes Todd Crosthwaite, KCSI

Works

References

External links

 
 

1835 births
Civil servants from Dublin (city)
1915 deaths
Administrators in British Burma
Indian Civil Service (British India) officers
Knights Commander of the Order of the Star of India
People educated at Merchant Taylors' School, Northwood
Members of the Council of India
Members of the Council of the Governor General of India